A Woman Scorned: The Betty Broderick Story is a 1992 American drama TV movie directed by Dick Lowry and written by Joe Cacaci. The film stars Meredith Baxter, Stephen Collins, Michelle Johnson, Kelli Williams, Stephen Root, and Lori Hallier. The film premiered on CBS on March 1, 1992.

Baxter was nominated for the Primetime Emmy Award for Outstanding Lead Actress - Miniseries or a Movie for her performance.

Plot

Cast 
Meredith Baxter as Betty Broderick
Stephen Collins as Dan Broderick
Michelle Johnson as Linda Kolkena  Broderick
Kelli Williams as Kate Broderick
Stephen Root as Kevin McDonald
Lori Hallier as Joan
Christine Jansen as Susan McDonald
Debra Jo Rupp as Alice
Tricia O'Neil as Margaret Fitzpatrick
Ralph Bruneau as Larry Broderick
Clayton Landey as Jerry
Jandi Swanson as Debbie Broderick
Jordan Christopher Michael as Tommy Broderick
Aaron Freeman as Grant Broderick
Anne Gee Byrd as Lois Marcos
Susanna Thompson as Receptionist
Richard Zavaglia as Judge Tamerlane
Norman Large as Betty's Lawyer
Thomas Kopache as Carl Fitzpatrick
Joanna Sanchez as Josephina
Jeff Allin as Mark Gaines
Jeff Hayenga as Judge
Penelope Windust as Dr. Miller
Tom Urich as M.C.

References

External links
 

1992 television films
1992 films
1990s English-language films
American drama television films
1992 drama films
Films directed by Dick Lowry
1990s American films